This is a comprehensive list of awards and nominations received by American singer/songwriter Michael Bolton.

ASCAP Pop Music Awards

!Ref.
|-
| 1989
| "That's What Love Is All About"
| rowspan=4|Most Performed Songs
| 
| 
|-
| rowspan=3|1991
| "How Am I Supposed to Live Without You"
| 
| rowspan=3|
|-
| "How Can We Be Lovers?"
| 
|-
| "Soul Provider"
|

American Music Awards
The American Music Awards is an annual awards ceremony created by Dick Clark in 1973. Bolton has won 6 awards from 10 nominations.

BMI Awards

Grammy Awards
The Grammy Awards are held annually by the National Academy of Recording Arts and Sciences. Bolton has won 2 awards from 4 nominations.

Juno Awards
Juno Awards are presented annually to Canadian musical artists and bands to acknowledge their artistic and technical achievements in all aspects of music. Winners are currently chosen by members of the Canadian Academy of Recording Arts and Sciences or, depending on the award, a panel of experts.

National Child Labor Committee

Primetime Emmy Awards

Pollstar Concert Industry Awards

!Ref.
|-
| 1991
| Tour
| Most Creative Tour Package
| 
|

Songwriters Hall of Fame

References

Bolton, Michael